Machine embroidery is an embroidery process whereby a sewing machine or embroidery machine is used to create patterns on textiles. It is used commercially in product branding, corporate advertising, and uniform adornment. It is also used in the fashion industry to decorate garments and apparel. Machine embroidery is used by hobbyists and crafters to decorate gifts, clothing, and home decor. Examples include designs on quilts, pillows, and wall hangings.

There are multiple types of machine embroidery. Free-motion sewing machine embroidery uses a basic zigzag sewing machine. Designs are done manually. Most commercial embroidery is done with link stitch embroidery. In link stitch embroidery, patterns may be manually or automatically controlled. Link Stitch embroidery is also known as chenille embroidery, and was patented by Pulse Microsystems in 1994. More modern computerized machine embroidery uses an embroidery machine or sewing/embroidery machine that is controlled with a computer that embroiders stored patterns. These machines may have multiple heads and threads.

History 
Before computers were affordable, most machine embroidery was completed by punching designs on paper tape that then ran through an embroidery machine. One error could ruin an entire design, forcing the creator to start over. 

Machine embroidery dates back to 1964 when Tajima started to manufacture and sell TAJIMA Multi-head Automatic Embroidery machines.

In 1973 Tajima introduced the TMB Series 6-needle (6 colors) full-automatic color-change embroidery machine. A few years later, in 1978, Tajima started manufacturing the TMBE Series Bridge Type Automatic Embroidery machines. These machines introduced electronic 6-needle automatic color change technology. 

Embroidery is a hobby, necessity, or a way to bring more money home. Embroidery is known for the beauty, art, and colors when it comes to this craft relying on needles, thread etc. This craft could be for art pieces to hang or to wear. In today's world Embroidery has gotten an upgrade on how to craft. Now you can use a machine that does all the work for you with all the detailing that's required to have.               

In 1980 the first computerized embroidery machines were introduced to the home market. Wilcom introduced the first computer graphics embroidery design system to run on a minicomputer. Melco, an international distribution network formed by Randal Melton and Bill Childs, created the first embroidery sample head for use with large Schiffli looms. These looms spanned several feet across and produced lace patches and large embroidery patterns. The sample head allowed embroiderers to avoid manually sewing the design sample and saved production time. Subsequently, it became the first computerized embroidery machine marketed to home sewers.

The economic policy of the Reagan presidency helped propel Melco to the top of the market. At the Show of the Americas in 1980, Melco unveiled the Digitrac, a digitizing system for embroidery machines. The digitized design was composed at six times the size of the embroidered final product. The Digitrac consisted of a small computer, mounted on an X and Y axis on a large whiteboard. It sold for $30,000. The original single-needle sample head sold for $10,000 and included a 1" paper-tape reader and 2 fonts. The digitizer marked common points in the design to create elaborate fill and satin stitch combinations.

In 1982, Tajima introduced the world's first electronic chenille embroidery machine, called the TMCE Series Multi-head Electronic Chenille Embroidery Machine. In the same year, they developed the automatic frame changer, a dedicated apparatus for rolled textile embroidery. Also in 1982, Pulse Microsystems introduced Stitchworks, the first PC based embroidery software, and the first software based on outlines rather than stitches. This was monumental to decorators, in that it allowed them to scale and change the properties and parts of their designs easily, on the computer. Designs were output to paper tape, which was read by the embroidery machine. Stitchworks was sold worldwide by Macpherson.

Melco patented the ability to sew circles with a satin stitch, as well as arched lettering generated from a keyboard. An operator digitized the design using similar techniques to punching, transferring the results to a 1" paper tape or later to a floppy disk. This design would then be run on the embroidery machine, which stitched out the pattern. Wilcom enhanced this technology in 1982 with the introduction of the first multi-user system, which allowed more than one person to work on the embroidery process, streamlining production times.

In 1983, Tajima created the TMLE Series Multi-Head Electronic Lock Stitch Chenille Embroidery machine, followed by the TMEF Series 9-needle Type Electronic Embroidery Machine in 1984. In 1986, Tajima introduced the world's first sequin embroidery machine, enabling designers to combine sequin embroidery with plain embroidery.

In 1987, Pulse Microsystems introduced a digital asset management application called DDS, which was a design librarian for embroidery machines. This made it more efficient for machine operators to access their designs. In 1988 Tajima designed the TMLE-D5 series embroidery machines, with a pair arrangement of lock-stitch-handle embroidery heads, which were capable of sewing multiple threads.

Brother Industries entered the embroidery industry after several computerized embroidery companies contracted it to provide sewing heads. Pulse Microsystems developed software for them called PG1. PG1 had tight integration with the embroidery machine using high-level protocol, enabling the machine to pull designs from software, rather than having the software push designs to the machine. This approach is still used today. Melco was acquired by Saurer in 1989.

The early 1990s were quiet for machine embroidery, but Tajima introduced a 12 needle machine into their series along with a noise reduction mechanism.

In 1995, Tajima added a multi-color (6-color) type to chenille embroidery machines and announced the ability to mix embroidery machines with plain chenille embroidery. They also began sales of the TLFD Series Laser-cut Embroidery Machines. In 1996, Pulse Microsystems introduced the computational geometry-based simulation of hand-created chenille using a spiral effect. Following this in 1997, Tajima introduced 15-needle machines, in response to the "multi-color-age".

In the late 1990s, Pulse Microsystems introduced networking to embroidery machines. It added a box, which allowed them to network and then pulls designs from a central server. It also provided machine feedback and allowed machines to be optically isolated to protect machines in an industrial environment. Since then, computerized machine embroidery has grown in popularity as costs have fallen for computers, software, and embroidery machines.

In the year 2000, Pulse Microsystems introduced Stitchport, which is a server-based embroidery engine for embroidery in a browser. This allowed for the factory automation of letter creation. Although they were not yet ready for it, this transformed the apparel industry by allowing manufacturers, stores, and end-users access to customized versions of the mass-produced garments and goods they had been buying throughout their lives, with no margin of error.

In 2001, Tajima created heater-wire sewing machines, which were innovative, combination machines.

In an environment that was finally ready for the individuality that mass customization allowed, the principles developed for Stitchport were adapted in 2008 for the creation of PulseID. PulseID allows for the automation of personalization, even on the largest industrial scale.

In 2013, Tajima released the TMAR-KC Series Multi-Head Embroidery Machine, equipped with a digitally controlled presser foot.

The major embroidery machine companies and software developers are continuing to adapt their commercial systems to market them for home use, including Janome, RNK, Floriani, Tacony Corporation and many more. As costs have fallen for computers, software and home market embroidery machines, the popularity of machine embroidery as a hobby has risen, and as such, many machine manufacturers sell their own lines of embroidery patterns. In addition, many individuals and independent companies also sell embroidery designs, and there are free designs available on the internet.

Types of machine embroidery

Free-motion machine embroidery 
In free-motion machine embroidery, embroidered designs are created by using a basic zigzag sewing machine. As this type of machine is used primarily for tailoring, it lacks the automated features of a specialized machine. The first zigzag sewing machine was patented by Helen Blanchard. To create free-motion machine embroidery, the embroiderer runs the machine and skillfully moves tightly hooped fabric under the needle to create a design. The "feed dogs" or machine teeth are lowered or covered, and the embroiderer moves the fabric manually. The embroiderer develops the embroidery manually, using the machine's settings for running stitch and fancier built-in stitches. A machine's zigzag stitch can create thicker lines within a design or be used to create a border. As this is a manual process rather than a digital reproduction, any pattern created using free-motion machine embroidery is unique and cannot be exactly reproduced, unlike with computerized embroidery.

Cornely hand-guided embroidery 
This embroidery inherited the name of the Cornely machine. Created in the 19th century to imitate the Beauvais stitch (chain stitch), it is still used today, especially in the fashion industry. Cornely embroidery is a so-called hand-guided embroidery. The operator directs his machine according to the pattern. The fabric is moved by a crank located under the machine. The Cornely also has a universal drive system controlled by a handle. Some models can embroider sequins, cords, braids, etc. There are also Cornely machines performing a classic straight stitch.

Computerized machine embroidery 
Most modern embroidery machines are computer controlled and specifically engineered for embroidery. Industrial and commercial embroidery machines and combination sewing-embroidery machines have a hooping or framing system that holds the framed area of fabric taut under the sewing needle and moves it automatically to create a design from a pre-programmed digital embroidery pattern.

Depending on its capabilities, the machine will require varying degrees of user input to read and sew embroidery designs. Sewing-embroidery machines generally have only one needle and require the user to change thread colors during the embroidery process. Multi-needle industrial machines are generally threaded prior to running the design and do not require re-threading. These machines require the user to input the correct color change sequence before beginning to embroider. Some can trim and change colors automatically.

The computerized machine embroidery process 

Machine embroidery is a multi-step process with many variables that impact the quality of the final product, including the type of fabric to be embellished, design size, stabilizer choice and type of thread utilized. The basic steps for creating embroidery with a computerized embroidery machine are as follows:
 Create an embroidery design file or purchase a stitchable machine embroidery file. Creation may take hours depending on the complexity of the design, and the software can be costly.
 Edit the design and/or combine with other designs.
 Export the design file to a (proprietary machine) embroidery file that mostly just contains commands for the embroidery machine. If you bought such a file, you may have to convert the file.
 Load the embroidery file into the embroidery machine, making sure it is the correct format for the machine and that the stitched design will fit in the appropriate hoop.
 Determine and mark the location of embroidery placement on the fabric to be embellished.
 Secure the fabric in a hoop with the appropriate stabilizer, and place it on the machine.
 Center the needle over the start point of the design.
 Start and monitor the embroidery machine, watching for errors and issues. Troubleshoot any problems as they arise. The operator should have plenty of needles, bobbins, a can of air (or small air compressor), a small brush, and scissors..
 Remove the completed design from machine. Separate the fabric from the hoop and trim the stabilizer, loose threads, etc.

List of machine embroidery design file extensions

References

Embroidery